Rehan Butt (Urdu: ریحان بٹ) is a former Pakistani professional field hockey player who played as a forward for the Pakistan national field hockey team. A world renowned player known for his play-making skills and shooting in-front of the goal Rehan was named in the FIH All Stars Team in 2008 and 2010.  In 2008 he was declared as the Best Asian Player by the Asian Hockey Federation. At international level Rehan represented Pakistan at three Olympics and two Hockey World Cups. He was part of the teams that finished third at three consecutive Champions Trophy in 2002, 2003 and 2004. He won the gold medal at the 2010 Asian Games.

Early life 
Rehan was born in Lahore, Pakistan (6 July, 1980) as the second child of his parents. His father Saqib Butt was a film producer by profession. Rehan's elder brother Rizwan also played hockey and they both used to go to the Noble Hockey Ground to play while Rehan was in fifth grade. There Rehan was spotted by the sport's teacher of Govt. Model Town High School of Lahore while he was playing on artificial turf who offered him to play for the school. Rehan and Rizwan helped the school win an inter-school trophy after seven years.

After completing his matriculation from the school Rehan got admission in the Government College University, Lahore based on sports scholarship. In his first year he helped the college reach the final of inter-college tournament where they lost the final to M.A.O. Graduate College  who were 22 times champions. Rehan asked his teacher to allow him select the team for next year and promised him to bring the trophy, his teacher agreed. Following year Rehan was in-charge of  team selection and for the position of goalkeeper he picked a tall young man, Salman Akbar who went on to play for Pakistan.

International career

Junior team 
Rehan was picked for the Pakistan junior team in 2001 for the tour of Germany. Rehan showed impressive performance with the junior squad and scored seven goals on the tour. Rehan was picked for the senior national team camp the following year under head coach Tahir Zaman but wasn't played for quite a while.

Debut and early years (2002-03) 
After impressive performances with the junior squad he was selected for the tour of Europe in 2002 where he made his debut in series against Spain. He scored in the opening match of the series in a 1–1 draw. He scored three goals in the four match series as Pakistan won the series 0–3. Despite impressive performance he was not part of the next campaign of the tour in England at the Commonwealth Games in Manchester. He was back in the squad for the 2002 Champions Trophy in Germany where he was substituted in the last eight minutes of the third position game against India, Pakistan were trailing by 3–2 but Rehan scored two goals in quick succession to win the match for Pakistan. This match earned attention for Rehan back at home where he was interviewed by leading sports newspaper. 

Butt appeared in all the tournaments for Pakistan in 2003. The team won the Azlan Shah Cup in March, finished third at the Champions Trophy in Amstelveen and were runner-ups at the 2003 Hockey Asia Cup in Kuala Lumpur. During this period him and Shakeel Abbasi built a young strong combination of forward line-up. As the team management rested senior players for future events Butt and Abbasi became the key forwards for the team.

Olympics and later year (2004-05) 
He was part of the squad for the pre-Olympic tours in Europe where he appeared in different tournaments in England, Spain and series against Germany. At the 2004 Olympics he appeared in all games and scored four goals as Pakistan finished 5th at the event.

He played in the test series against India later on and in the Champions Trophy at home in Lahore at the end of the year.

Pakistan toured Europe in 2005 where they won the 2005 HockeyRabo Trophy after defeating Olympic Champions Australia in the final. Butt scored the equalizing goal as Pakistan won 4–3. This was Pakistan's first high-profile tournament won since their World Cup win in 1994.

2006 Hockey World Cup and Asian Games 
Pakistan started the year with the bilateral test series against India. Butt had made a reputation of a prolific striker against the traditional rivals India by now. He played in all of the tournaments in lead up to the World Cup in Germany in September. He scored a hat-trick at the Commonwealth Games in Melbourne, Pakistan finished runner-ups after they lost the final to Australia.

He scored three goals at the 2006 World Cup but Pakistan had a disappointing finish of sixth place. The team finished with a bronze medal at the Asian Games later in the year.

Captaincy and Olympics (2007-08) 
Butt was named captain for the first time for the 2007 Sultan Azlan Shah Cup. He remained captaincy for the tournaments in Europe and China in preparation for the Olympics next year. In 2008 Butt was the top scorer at Azlan Shah Cup with six goals. Pakistan had their worst result at Olympics in Beijing and he managed to score just one goal.

Later years (2009-12) 
He maintained good individual performances despite Pakistan showing mixed results from disastrous campaigns at the 2010 Hockey World Cup and Azlan Shah Cup but winning the gold medal at the Asian Games for the first time after 20 years, Butt scored a goal in the 2–0 final victory against Malaysia. Butt was named in the All Star Team for the second time in 2010.

From 2011 he was largely out of the team due to injuries and disciplinary issues. After the tour from Europe in July 2011 he was dropped from the team for the remainder of the season because of behavioral issues but Butt denied these claims. Despite team's poor results and calls for his inclusion he was not picked for the team.

In 2012 he was called back to the squad along with other senior players for the European tour before the 2012 Olympics. He scored the opening goal against Spain in the 1–1 draw at the first match of the Olympics.

Though he didn't announce his retirement he was not considered for any future event. He later took up role as a player-coach after his playing days.

Club career 
He started his domestic career playing for WAPDA in Pakistan's National Hockey Championship. He played for Bangalore Lions in Premier Hockey League in 2006 where he was pivotal in their title winning campaign. In 2008/09 he signed for Laren HC in the Netherlands. Afterwards in 2010 he played in the Malaysia Hockey League for Sapura. In 2012 he played in the unsanctioned World Series Hockey for Chandigarh Comets.

Management roles 
Butt along with his former teammate Muhammad Saqlain became part of the Pakistan team's management from 2016 under Roelant Oltmans. He was assistant coach at the 2018 Hockey World Cup for team Pakistan. He also managed Pakistan development squad for the tour of Oman in 2019.

International career statistics
Appearances and goals for the national team

As of August 2012

References

External links
 Rehan Butt at FIH

1980 births
Living people
Pakistani male field hockey players
Field hockey players from Lahore
Olympic field hockey players of Pakistan
Field hockey players at the 2004 Summer Olympics
Field hockey players at the 2008 Summer Olympics
Field hockey players at the 2010 Commonwealth Games
World Series Hockey players
Field hockey players at the 2012 Summer Olympics
2006 Men's Hockey World Cup players
2010 Men's Hockey World Cup players
Asian Games medalists in field hockey
Field hockey players at the 2002 Asian Games
Field hockey players at the 2006 Asian Games
Field hockey players at the 2010 Asian Games
Asian Games gold medalists for Pakistan
Asian Games bronze medalists for Pakistan
Commonwealth Games silver medallists for Pakistan
Commonwealth Games medallists in field hockey
Medalists at the 2006 Asian Games
Medalists at the 2010 Asian Games
Pakistani people of Kashmiri descent
People from Lahore
Medallists at the 2006 Commonwealth Games